The Saint Louis Chess Club (previously named the Chess Club and Scholastic Center of Saint Louis) is a chess venue located in the Central West End in St. Louis, Missouri, United States. Opened on July 17, 2008, it contained a tournament hall and a basement broadcast studio before its expansion began. On September 19, 2022, all Club operations temporarily moved to the adjacent space that housed the original incarnation of the chess-themed Kingside Diner. All tournaments in the interim are held at 308 N Euclid Ave, the old Kingside Diner space, the basement of The Chase Park Plaza Hotel, or at Saint Louis University.

History
In 2007, multi-millionaire Rex Sinquefield opened the Chess Club and Scholastic Center of Saint Louis. In August 2010, Sinquefield provided seed funding to move the World Chess Hall of Fame to St. Louis, citing the Chess Club's presence and reputation.

It has been host to the U.S. Championships and U.S. Women's Championships since 2009 and the Junior Closed Championship has been held there since 2010.

The STLCC features a Grandmaster-in-Residence, who provides lectures, lessons and camps for the community. The titled players who have held the position are (in order of first residency): Ben Finegold, Yasser Seirawan, Alejandro Ramírez, Varuzhan Akobian, Jennifer Shahade, Ronen Har-Zvi, Irina Krush, Joshua Friedel, Anna Sharevich, Robert Hungaski, Bryan Smith, Maurice Ashley, Aviv Friedman, Tatev Abrahamyan, Mac Molner, Eric Hansen, Vita Kryvoruchko, Kateřina Němcová, Robin van Kampen, Cristian Chirilă, Eric Rosen, Denes Boros, Elshan Moradiabadi, Sabina Foisor, Vitaly Neimer, Atanas Kolev, Yaroslav Zherebukh, Mauricio Flores Ríos, Jesse Kraai, Vladimir Georgiev, Pepe Cuenca, Aman Hambleton, Aleksandr Lenderman, Tiberiu Georgescu, Steven Zierk, Dorsa Derakhshani, Joel Benjamin, Dariusz Swiercz, Mircea Pârligras, Lázaro Bruzón, Yuniesky Quesada, Alex Yermolinsky, Alexander Shabalov, Romain Édouard, Evgenij Miroshnichenko, Cemil Can Ali Marandi, Igor Novikov, and Joshua Sheng. Parligras is the only guest to teach completely virtually, during the COVID-19 pandemic.

The success of the 2009–2010 U.S. Championships led the United States Chess Federation to name the STLCC as the 2010 Chess Club of the Year. The USCF also recognized STLCC Executive Director Tony Rich as Organizer of the Year for both years.

The STLCC holds yearly tournaments in Fischer random chess or chess960 that they trademark as Chess 9LX.

See also
Sinquefield Cup

References

External links 
 

Chess clubs in the United States
Buildings and structures in St. Louis
Sports venues in St. Louis
Central West End, St. Louis
2008 establishments in Missouri